, son of Kanesuke, was a court noble (kugyo) of the late Muromachi period. He held a regent position Kampaku from 1542 to 1545. The succession of the household (Takatsukasa family) was halted after his death until Takatsukasa Nobufusa, adopted son of Tadafuyu, continued it.

References
 https://web.archive.org/web/20070927231943/http://nekhet.ddo.jp/people/japan/fstakatukasa.html#tadafuyutt

1509 births
1546 deaths
Fujiwara clan
Takatsukasa family